The Rangitikei District Council is the local government authority for Rangitikei District in New Zealand. It is a territorial authority elected to represent the  people of Rangitikei. Since October 2013, the Mayor of Rangitikei is Andy Watson, who succeeded Robert "Chalky" Leary. The council consists of a mayor who is elected at large, and 11 councillors elected across three (previously five) wards, one of whom gets chosen as deputy mayor. There are also two community boards – for Rātana and Taihape. The councillors are elected under the first-past-the-post (FPTP) system in triennial elections.

History
The Rangitikei District Council was established in 1989 as part of the 1989 local government reforms.

Up to 2019 the District had five wards: Bulls, Hunterville, Marton, Taihape and Turakina. In 2019 the number of wards was reduced to three: Northern, Central and Southern.

Council membership

2016–2019

During the 2016–2019 term, the composition of the Council was as follows:

2013–2016

During the 2013–2016 term, the composition of the Council was as follows:

2010–2013

During the 2010–2013 term, the composition of the Council was as follows:

2007–2010
During the 2007–2010 term, the composition of the Council was as follows:

References

External links
Rangitikei District Council official website
Information about the Rangitikei District Council on LocalCouncils.govt.nz

 
 
Government agencies of New Zealand
Territorial authorities of New Zealand